For Old Jefferson in Jefferson Parish, Louisiana, see: Jefferson, Louisiana

Old Jefferson is a census-designated place (CDP) in East Baton Rouge Parish, Louisiana, United States. The population was 6,980 at the 2010 census, up from 5,631 in 2000. It is part of the Baton Rouge Metropolitan Statistical Area.

Geography
Old Jefferson is located at  (30.381292, -91.010376).

According to the United States Census Bureau, the CDP has a total area of 3.5 square miles (9.1 km), all land.

Demographics

As of the 2020 United States census, there were 7,339 people, 2,772 households, and 2,021 families residing in the CDP.

As of the census of 2000, there were 5,631 people, 2,044 households, and 1,582 families residing in the CDP. The racial makeup of the CDP was 90.37% White, 5.68% African American, 0.39% Native American, 1.90% Asian, 0.07% Pacific Islander, 0.44% from other races, and 1.14% from two or more races. Hispanic or Latino of any race were 1.56% of the population.

There were 2,044 households, out of which 45.5% had children under the age of 18 living with them, 62.9% were married couples living together, 10.4% had a female householder with no husband present, and 22.6% were non-families. 17.9% of all households were made up of individuals, and 3.1% had someone living alone who was 65 years of age or older. The average household size was 2.75 and the average family size was 3.15.

In the CDP, the population was spread out, with 29.4% under the age of 18, 8.1% from 18 to 24, 36.8% from 25 to 44, 21.0% from 45 to 64, and 4.6% who were 65 years of age or older. The median age was 32 years. For every 100 females, there were 98.4 males. For every 100 females age 18 and over, there were 93.8 males.

The median income for a household in the CDP was $52,220, and the median income for a family was $59,778. Males had a median income of $41,164 versus $27,044 for females. The per capita income for the CDP was $21,410. About 2.3% of families and 3.7% of the population were below the poverty line, including 4.8% of those under age 18 and none of those age 65 or over.

Education

Public schools
Old Jefferson is served by East Baton Rouge Parish Public Schools.

Zoned schools include:
 Woodlawn Elementary School in Old Jefferson serves almost all of the community while a small segment to the north is zoned to Shenandoah Elementary School in Shenandoah
 Woodlawn Middle School in Shenandoah
Woodlawn High School in Old Jefferson

In previous eras Parkview Elementary School served the northern half of Old Jefferson, while Jefferson Terrace Elementary School served the southern section of Old Jefferson.

Private schools
Private schools in the area include:
 Most Blessed Sacrament Catholic School (PK-8) in Old Jefferson
 St. Michael the Archangel High School (9-12) in Shenandoah

The district provides transportation to these two private Catholic schools.

References

External links

 Woodlawn Elementary School
 Most Blessed Sacrament Catholic School

Census-designated places in Louisiana
Census-designated places in East Baton Rouge Parish, Louisiana
Baton Rouge metropolitan area